Q-Sensei is a privately owned software company developing search technology and search-based applications for searching through unstructured and structured data. They make searching through diverse types and sources of data faster, easier, and more powerful. They developed enterprise search applications and are developing analytic features.

Q-Sensei is based on multi-dimensional search, which combines full text with faceted search and content analysis to present data organized and correlated along multiple facets or "dimensions" (e.g. date, tag, author, source, language, content type, etc.). This lets the end user dive deeper into a search query on multiple fronts. The company is product-focused and develops nearly plug and play applications that companies can deploy mostly on their own. Previous projects included: a “next generation” enterprise search platform; an RSS feed aggregator and reader; and an online service for searching scholarly literature.

Q-Sensei was formed in 2007 through the merger of German-based social knowledge network Lalisio and the US search technology company, QUASM. The company is headquartered in San Francisco, CA. Its European office is in Erfurt, Germany.

Its name is derived from the Japanese word Sensei, meaning "master" or "mentor".

Products/applications
 Q-Sensei Spark -- plug-ins that integrate enterprise search into existing business applications. Available for Atlassian Confluence and JIRA. 
 Q-Sensei Fuse -- algorithm-driven search and index program wrapped in an easy-to-install service layer.

Awards
 Initiative Mittelstand:  & 
  
  
 Frost & Sullivan 2012 Global Enterprise Search Price Performance Value Award
  (for Q-Sensei Enterprise)
  (IT Innovations Award Winner, Knowledge Management category)

See also
 Tech companies in the New York metropolitan area

References

Software companies based in the San Francisco Bay Area
Software companies of the United States
2007 establishments in the United States
Software companies established in 2007